Marist School is a private Catholic school located in Brookhaven, Georgia, United States, north of the city of Atlanta.  Founded in 1901, it is operated independently of the Archdiocese of Atlanta.

History

Marist School was founded by the Society of Mary (Marists) in 1901, opening its doors on October 2 of that year. The school originated as the boys' military school Marist College High School, and was located in a three-story schoolhouse on Ivy Street, now called Peachtree Center Avenue, in downtown Atlanta. In the 1940s, while it was a military school, the boys wore a blue military uniform with a soft cap, and performed a marching drill routine on the field, which was next to the school and in front of the Sacred Heart Catholic School.

Notable alumni

 Cecil Alexander, Atlanta architect (attended freshman through junior years)
 Paul V. Applegarth, first chief executive officer of Millennium Challenge Corporation (class of 1964)
 Bret Baier - Fox News correspondent, host of Special Report with Bret Baier (class of 1988)
 Marshall Brain - founder of HowStuffWorks
 Christopher M. Carr - Attorney General - State of Georgia (class of 1990)
 Drew Dollar - racing driver in NASCAR and the ARCA Menards Series (class of 2019)
 Andrew Economos - NFL long snapper, Tampa Bay Buccaneers
 Kyle Farmer - Minnesota Twins shortstop
Kyle Hamilton - American football safety, Notre Dame Fighting Irish
 Omari Hardwick - Star of the STARZ hit series Power; former UGA football player
 Matt Harpring - NBA player, Utah Jazz
 David Hasselhoff - actor Knight Rider, Baywatch, attended but did not graduate
 Will Heller - NFL tight end, Detroit Lions
 John Hester - Los Angeles Angels catcher
 Kathleen Hersey - Olympic swimmer; finished 8th in the 2008 Olympics in Beijing (class of 2008)
 Kit Hoover - TV personality
 Disco Inferno - WCW wrestler, real name Glenn Gilberti
 Ernie Johnson Jr. - Sportscaster for Turner Sports and host of Inside the NBA for TNT
 Bobby Jones - golf legend, attended but did not graduate
 Chris Krebs - inaugural Director of the Cybersecurity and Infrastructure Security Agency
 Ed Lafitte - MLB pitcher for the Detroit Tigers (1909–12), Brooklyn Tip-Tops (1914–15), and Buffalo Blues (1915)
 Patrick Mannelly - NFL long snapper, Chicago Bears
 Peter Marshall - former world record-holding swimmer in 50 and 100 yard backstroke (class of 2000)
 Sean McVay - NFL head coach of the Los Angeles Rams (Class of 2004)
 David Nort - Visual Effects Coordinator, The Kitchen (2019 film), The Many Saints of Newark
 Bert Parks -  longtime host (1955–1979) of annual Miss America telecast
 Bob Olderman - NFL player
 Ryan Roushandel - NASL, Atlanta Silverbacks
 Anderson Russell - NFL, Redskins
 Leigh Torrence - NFL defensive back, New Orleans Saints
 Mark Watson - MLB pitcher for the Cleveland Indians (2000), Seattle Mariners (2002), and Cincinnati Reds (2003)
 Rob Woodall - Georgia US House of Representatives (7th District)

See also
 National Catholic Educational Association

References

External links 
 Marist School website
 Ivy Street historical marker

Catholic secondary schools in Georgia (U.S. state)
Education in Brookhaven, Georgia
Private middle schools in DeKalb County, Georgia
Private high schools in DeKalb County, Georgia
Educational institutions established in 1901
1901 establishments in Georgia (U.S. state)
Marist School (Georgia) alumni